Annaghdown Abbey (full title: the Abbey of St Mary de Portu Patrum but also commonly known as Annaghdown Priory) is a ruined house of the Arroasian canons in the townland of Annaghdown, County Galway, Ireland.

The site was probably founded by Turlough O'Conor around 1140 and dissolved after the Reformation in 1562. The remaining ruins include a church, a cloister and living quarters. Some details of the windows suggest that they were constructed in the 13th century while the south window of the choir is in the transitional style from c. 1200. As the east window itself appears to be missing and the east window of Annaghdown Cathedral,  in a south-east direction, is of a similar period, it is possible that it was moved to the cathedral. Author Peter Harbison posits that the perfect fit of the east window of the cathedral does not make a late move likely. The ruins of Annaghdown Abbey are a National Monument.

See also

 Annaghdown
 Bishop of Annaghdown

References

External links
 Annaghdown Cathedral webpage
 List of headstones in Annaghdown Abbey (including photos) on Find A Grave

Christian monasteries in the Republic of Ireland
Religious buildings and structures in County Galway
1140s establishments in Ireland
1562 disestablishments in Ireland
Former cathedrals in Ireland
Ruins in the Republic of Ireland
Former churches in the Republic of Ireland